Rißbach is a river of Tyrol, Austria and Bavaria, Germany. Its source is in the Karwendel mountains in Austria.

See also
List of rivers of Bavaria

References

Rivers of Tyrol (state)
Rivers of Bavaria
Rivers of Austria
Rivers of Germany
International rivers of Europe